SBSP may refer to:

 Space-based solar power
 SpongeBob SquarePants, an animated Nickelodeon television series
 Suheldev Bharatiya Samaj Party, a regional political party in India
 Polish Independent Highland Brigade, an official name for the Polish military unit created in France in 1939
 Congonhas-São Paulo International Airport, an airport with ICAO airport code SBSP